La Poste is a sailing boat designed by Bruce Farr and built for the French postal service, who participated in different yacht races led by different captains, Daniel Mallé and Éric Tabarly who replaced Daniel Malle as skipper after the second leg in the Whitbread Round the World Race. The crew of La Poste was composed by postal service employees.
During Leg 2 of the race while La Poste was leading, the team decided to turn around to answer a distress signal from another boat, Brooksfield, sailing into 50-knot winds.

In 2012 La poste participated in the Barcolana regatta with a team composed by member of Mascalzone Latino and 8 boys and girls with Down Syndrome..The documentary "The wind force", directed by Emilia Ricasoli and Alessio Muzi and aired on the Italian broadcaster La7, tells the team's preparation and the subsequent participation in the regatta.
Since 2013 Giorgio Cerasuolo is the Captain of La Poste.
In 2014 participated in the Gran Prix del Atlántico and set a record time from Lanzarote to Santa Marta in 15 days.

As of 2017 La Poste is in Linton Bay, Panama, and is for sale.

References

External links 
 

Sailing yachts designed by Bruce Farr
1990s sailing yachts
Volvo Ocean Race yachts
Maxi yachts
Sailing yachts of France
Sailboat type designs by Bruce Farr